José Carlos Ferreira Filho (born 24 April 1983), known as Zé Carlos, is a retired Brazilian professional footballer who played as a striker.

Club career
Born in Maceió, Alagoas, Zé Carlos started out at local Sport Club Corinthians Alagoano, who loaned him several times for the duration of his contract, including to clubs in Portugal and South Korea. He made his Série A debuts after being released, appearing rarely for Associação Atlética Ponte Preta during the 2005 season as it narrowly avoided relegation.

In 2006, Zé Carlos returned to the K League and joined Jeonbuk Hyundai Motors FC, winning that year's AFC Champions League after scoring the decisive goal in a 1–2 away loss against Al-Karamah SC in the final's second leg (3–2 aggregate win). He subsequently returned to Corinthians, who again successively loaned him; during one of these spells, with Cruzeiro Esporte Clube, he received the fastest red card in the history of the Brazilian top flight, being sent off after just twelve seconds for elbowing Clube Atlético Mineiro's Renan Teixeira during a 12 July 2009 clash.

In the 2012 campaign, with Criciúma Esporte Clube, Zé Carlos netted a career-best 27 goals to help his team promote from Série B. On 3 February 2013, he signed for Changchun Yatai F.C. in the Chinese Super League.

Honors
Jeonbuk Hyundai Motors
AFC Champions League: 1
 2006

References

External links
 
  
 

 
 

1983 births
Living people
People from Maceió
Brazilian footballers
Association football forwards
Campeonato Brasileiro Série A players
Campeonato Brasileiro Série B players
Sport Club Corinthians Alagoano players
Clube de Regatas Brasil players
Associação Atlética Ponte Preta players
América Futebol Clube (RN) players
Paulista Futebol Clube players
Cruzeiro Esporte Clube players
Associação Portuguesa de Desportos players
Criciúma Esporte Clube players
Segunda Divisão players
FC Porto B players
F.C. Vizela players
K League 1 players
Ulsan Hyundai FC players
Jeonbuk Hyundai Motors players
J1 League players
Gamba Osaka players
Chinese Super League players
Changchun Yatai F.C. players
UAE Pro League players
Sharjah FC players
Ajman Club players
Paraná Clube players
São Bernardo Futebol Clube players
Clube do Remo players
Murici Futebol Clube players
UAE First Division League players
Brazilian expatriate footballers
Expatriate footballers in Portugal
Expatriate footballers in South Korea
Expatriate footballers in Japan
Expatriate footballers in China
Expatriate footballers in the United Arab Emirates
Brazilian expatriate sportspeople in Portugal
Brazilian expatriate sportspeople in South Korea
Brazilian expatriate sportspeople in China
Brazilian expatriate sportspeople in the United Arab Emirates
Sportspeople from Alagoas